The Senouire is a  long river in the Haute-Loire département, south-central France. Its source is at Sembadel. It flows generally west. It is a right tributary of the Allier into which it flows between Fontannes and Vieille-Brioude, near Brioude.

Communes along its course
This list is ordered from source to mouth: Sembadel, Bonneval, La Chaise-Dieu, Malvières, La Chapelle-Geneste, Connangles, Saint-Pal-de-Senouire, La Chapelle-Bertin, Collat, Josat, Sainte-Marguerite, Mazerat-Aurouze, Paulhaguet, Salzuit, Domeyrat, Frugières-le-Pin, Lavaudieu, Fontannes, Vieille-Brioude

References

Rivers of France
Rivers of Haute-Loire
Rivers of Auvergne-Rhône-Alpes